Luck is a surname. For the people with the German family name spelled Lück, see Lück.

 Luck (Kent cricketer), 18th-century English professional cricketer
 Andrew Luck (born 1989), American football quarterback
 Aubrey Luck (1900–1999), Australian politician
 Babar Luck (born 1970), English musician
 Charles Luck (1886–?), British gymnast
 Edward Luck (born 1948), American U.N. adviser
 Ethan Luck (born 1978), American musician
 Frank Luck (born 1967), German bi-athlete
 Gary E. Luck (born 1937), American Army general
 Isaac Luck (1817–1881), New Zealand architect
 J. Murray Luck (1899-1993), Canadian biochemist
 Jordan Luck (born 1961), New Zealand musician
 Karin Luck, German rower
 Karl-Heinz Luck (born 1945), German Nordic combined skier
 Michael Luck, British computer scientist
 Micheal Luck (born 1982), Australian rugby league player
 Oliver Luck (born 1960), American professional football player and sports executive; father of Andrew Luck
 Peter Luck (1944-2017), Australian author, TV journalist, producer and presenter
 Sophie Luck (born 1989), Australian actress
 Stephanie Luck, American politician
 Tony Luck, Canadian politician
 Hans von Luck (1911–1997), German World War II officer